Lindsay may refer to:

People
Clan Lindsay, a Scottish family clan
Lindsay (name), an English surname and given name, derived from the Scottish clan name; variants include Lindsey, Lyndsay, Linsay, Linsey, Lyndsey, Lyndsy, Lynsay, Lynsey

Places
Australia
Division of Lindsay, an electoral district in New South Wales

Canada
Lindsay, Ontario

United States
Lindsay, California
Lindsay, Montana
Lindsay, Nebraska
Lindsay, Oklahoma
Lindsay, South Dakota, a ghost town
Lindsay, Cooke County, Texas
Lindsay, Reeves County, Texas

Other uses
 Lindsay (crater), a lunar impact crater
 Lindsay (TV series), an American reality TV series
 , a destroyer escort transferred to the Royal Navy

See also
 Lindsey (disambiguation)